Linda Fahrni (born 25 May 1993) is a Swiss competitive sailor. She competed for Switzerland at the 2016 Summer Olympics in Rio de Janeiro, in the women's 470 class, and at the 2020 Summer Olympics in Tokyo, also in the women's 470 class.

References

External links
 
 
 

1993 births
Living people
Swiss female sailors (sport)
Olympic sailors of Switzerland
Sailors at the 2016 Summer Olympics – 470
Sailors at the 2020 Summer Olympics – 470